The chile relleno (literally "stuffed chile") is a dish in Mexican cuisine that originated in the city of Puebla. In 1858, it was described as a "green chile pepper stuffed with minced meat and coated with eggs".

The most common pepper used is Puebla's poblano pepper, though New Mexico chile, pasilla, or even jalapeño peppers are popular as well. It is typically stuffed with melted cheese, such as queso Chihuahua or queso Oaxaca or with picadillo meat made of diced pork, raisins and nuts, seasoned with canella; covered in an egg white batter, simply corn masa flour and fried, or without any batter at all. Although it is often served in a tomato sauce, the sauces can vary.

Regional variation

Mexico
Some regional versions in Mexico use rehydrated dry chiles such as anchos or pasillas.

United States
In the United States, chiles rellenos are usually filled with asadero or Monterey Jack cheese, but can also be found with cheddar or other cheeses, as well as ground or minced meat.

Variations, which can be seen based on regional tastes or experimentation, include:
 Chiles en nogada
 Pecan-encrusted
 Crab-filled
 Inside of a "chile relleno burrito"
 In a casserole form (which can be more practical for serving groups of people)
 Tuna filled
 Squash blossom stuffed
 Mushroom stuffed
 Shrimp stuffed

A recipe from 1914 (as "chili reinas") is published in a period guidebook to San Francisco restaurants.

Guatemala
In Guatemala, the pimiento pepper is stuffed with shredded pork and vegetables. Like the Mexican version, it is covered with egg batter and fried. It is served with tomato sauce or inside a bread bun.

Gallery

See also
 Chiles en nogada
 Jalapeño popper
 Dinamita
 Mirchi bada
 List of Mexican dishes

References

Mexican cuisine
New Mexican cuisine
Stuffed vegetable dishes
American vegetable dishes